Burning Blue is a 2013 American United States Naval aviation drama film, directed by D.M.W. Greer and starring Trent Ford and Rob Mayes. The film is based on the 1992 play of the same name by Greer about a U.S. Navy accident investigation which becomes a gay witch hunt during the "Don't Ask, Don't Tell" era.

Plot
Best friends Lieutenants Dan Lynch (Trent Ford) and Will Stephensen (Morgan Spector) are U.S. Navy fighter pilots flying the McDonnell Douglas F/A-18C/D Hornet fighter aircraft. Both pilots have an aspiration to become the youngest pilots accepted into the space program. After two accidents, one of which is due to Will's failing eyesight, their unit is subject to a NCIS investigation led by John Cokely (Michael Sirow).

At the same time, a third pilot, Matt Blackwood (Rob Mayes), arrives on the carrier and quickly develops a close friendship with Dan, driving a wedge between Dan and Will. Cokely's investigation leads to him uncovering rumours about Dan and Matt's relationship just as they both begin to fall in love. When Matt decides to leave his wife and move in with Dan, there is a third accident, and Cokely's investigation ramps up the pressure on Dan.

Cast

 Trent Ford as Lieutenant Dan Lynch
 Morgan Spector as Lieutenant William Stephensen
 Rob Mayes as Lieutenant Matthew Blackwood
 William Lee Scott as Charlie Trumbo
 Michael Sirow as John Cokely
 Cotter Smith as Admiral Lynch
 Tammy Blanchard as Susan
 Tracy Weiler as Nancy
 Gwynneth Bensen as Tammi
 Mark Doherty as Skipper
 Chris Chalk as Special Agent Jones
 Jordan Dean as Stewie Kelleher
 Johnny Hopkins as Gorden
 Haviland Morris as Grace Lynch
 Karolina Muller as Olenka
 Michael Cumpsty as Admiral Stephensen

Production
Burning Blue was based on the 1992 play by D.M.W. Greer, his first play. The film adaptation began production in 2010, with principal photography taking place primarily in New York City
and Long Island, New York. Some of the aerial and naval scenes used the USS John C. Stennis (CVN-74) aircraft carrier identified as the fictitious CVN-44. The scenes on the deck of the USS John C. Stennis showed current operational United States Navy aircraft and equipment including:

 Boeing E-3B Sentry
 Grumman F-14 Tomcat
 Lockheed S-3B Viking
 McDonnell Douglas F/A-18C/D Hornet
 Northrop Grumman EA-6B Prowler
 Sikorsky SH-3 Sea King
 Sikorsky SH-60 Seahawk

The scene at Naval Air Station Oceana was actually photographed at CFB Cold Lake, Alberta, Canada. Canadian CF-18 Hornet fighter aircraft represented  U.S. Navy aircraft.

Reception
Burning Blue has received generally negative critical reviews. On review aggregator Rotten Tomatoes, the film holds an approval rating of 25% based on twelve reviews, with an average rating of 4.38/10.  On Metacritic, the film has a weighted average score of 29 out of 100, based on seven critics, indicating "generally unfavorable reviews".

Reviewer Anita Gates noted in The New York Times: "The script, by Mr. Greer and Helene Kvale, rolls along with lifeless, profoundly unimaginative dialogue ('The wings on your chest are proof that you’ve accomplished something great'; 'I like women'; 'I’m not gay'; 'Tears won’t bring him back'; 'No more lies'). Then there’s a scene in church, and the priest inexplicably begins quoting Rainer Maria Rilke’s gorgeous 'Go to the Limits of Your Longing'." The writing and directing were criticized, but Ford and Mayes were praised for their portrayals.

References

Notes

Citations

Bibliography

 Beck, Simon D. The Aircraft-Spotter's Film and Television Companion. Jefferson, North Carolina: McFarland and Company, 2016.

External links
 
 
 
 

2013 drama films
2013 LGBT-related films
2013 films
American aviation films
American LGBT-related films
Gay-related films
LGBT-related drama films
Lionsgate films
Films about the United States Navy
American films based on plays
Films about anti-LGBT sentiment
Homophobia in fiction
2010s English-language films
2010s American films